Zuunmod ("Hundred Trees") is the administrative seat of Mongolia's Töv Province. It has a population of 16,953 (2017) inhabitants and an area of 19.18 square kilometres. Zuunmod was established as the administrative center of Töv Province in 1942. Until that time, the administration of the aimag had been located in Ulaanbaatar.

The significant Battle of Jao Modo took place here in early May 1649, ending with the victory for the Qing dynasty.

Livestock

In 2004, Zuunmod officially had roughly 24,000 head of livestock, among them 8,500 goats, 12,000 sheep, 2,000 cattle, about as many horses, and no camels.

Climate
Zuunmod has a dry-winter subarctic climate (Köppen Dwc).

Notable residents

 Ganzorigiin Mandakhnaran - Mongolian wrestler

Gallery

References

 Төв аймаг - Зуунмод

Districts of Töv Province
Aimag centers
Populated places in Mongolia